Daniel T. Tranel (born October 20, 1957) is an American professor of neurology at the University of Iowa. He has been recognized as a fellow of the American Association for the Advancement of Science. While a graduate student at the University of Iowa, he helped establish the Iowa Neurological Patient Registry, which he currently directs. The Iowa Neurological Patient Registry includes cases of unique brain injuries, such as Patient S.M. and Patient E.V.R. Tranel also directs the Interdisciplinary Graduate Program in Neuroscience at the University of Iowa. He serves as editor-in-chief of the Journal of Clinical and Experimental Neuropsychology and is a contributing author to the 5th edition of Neuropsychological Assessment, a classic textbook in neuropsychology used by most neuropsychologists.

Tranel researches brain-behavior relationships in humans. He uses the lesion method, neuropsychological testing, and functional imaging (including PET and fMRI) to study topics such as retrieval of knowledge and words, emotion, decision-making, fact-processing, nonconscious processing, memory, and psychophysiology. Tranel has authored over 600 research papers and been cited more than 80,000 times. His discoveries include determining that nouns and verbs are stored in separate parts of the brain and that patients with prosopagnosia have physical responses to familiar faces despite lack of conscious recognition.

Tranel became known for being one of a pair of professors who rejected the graduate school application of Aurora theater gunman James Holmes.

References

External links
University of Iowa profile
Clinical profile

Living people
American neurologists
University of Iowa faculty
1957 births
University of Notre Dame alumni
University of Iowa alumni
People from Iowa City, Iowa
21st-century American psychologists
Academic journal editors
20th-century American psychologists